Dalma Mádl (née Némethy; 9 November 1932 – 22 October 2021) was the First Lady of Hungary from 2000 to 2005 and the wife of President Ferenc Mádl.

Life
She was born in 1932 in Pécs when her family name was Némethy and she was the fourth child. Her intellectual family sent her to Patrona Hungariae High School in Budapest. She started work at the Pediatric Hospital of Pécs in 1951.

She married Ferenc Mádl four years later. 

She was the First Lady of Hungary from 2000 to 2005.

Dalma Mádl died in Budapest at the age of 88 on 22 October 2021.

Honours
:
 Dame Grand Cross of the Order of Isabella the Catholic (2005)

References

External links

Heti Válasz | A szeretet követe

1932 births
2021 deaths
First ladies of Hungary
People from Pécs